Tanhaiyan ( Solitude) is an Hotstar originals romantic streaming television series. It stars Barun Sobti and Surbhi Jyoti in lead roles. The series included 9 episodes of about 20 minutes each. It was produced by 4 Lions Films and distributed by Star India.

Plot
The show focuses on two individuals, Meera and Haider, who meet at the wedding of their friends Avantika and Sid.  Haider is a Casanova and a carefree person, while Meera is bubbly and cheerful. Haider holds himself responsible for his friend Raza's suicide which, apparently, was because of a love failure, while Meera feels alone after her parents died in a car accident. Both bottle it under their new personalities.

The two constantly bicker with each other and decide to go for a one-night stand. However, Meera is unable to go through with it. They bond, and soon, they begin to develop feelings for each other. Haider feels affected by Meera and pushes her away, scared by his feelings.

Meanwhile, Avantika struggles with a secret of her own. When Sid and Avantika were briefly broken up, Avantika had a brief affair with someone else. Avantika reveals her long-buried secret to Sid, and he breaks off the marriage. Before packing her bags, Meera teaches Haider how to forget someone, but Haider visits Raza's mother, he decides not to let his love away and proposes to her, which she accepts.

Sid and Avantika reunite after sorting out their problems. On the engagement day of Haider and Meera, Haider notices Meera's earrings and recognizes them as his mother's, which were owned by Raza. Haider unlocks Raza's laptop (which was in his possession) by typing Meera's birthdate, and the laptop opens with a picture of Meera as the wallpaper. Heartbroken, Haider leaves the venue without any explanation.

Months later, Meera decides to go abroad for work and visits Avantika, who tells her about Raza. Meera remembers how she knows Raza, who worked with her but never knew his crush on her. She concludes that he might have committed suicide since she stopped working after her parents' death. She received the earrings as a gift, but she never knew who sent them.

Meanwhile, after a phone call with Raza's mother, who tells Haider how Meera has no part in Raza's death. Upon hearing this, he decides to reunite with her. On the night before Meera's flight, Haider, wondering where to search for her, visits his house where they first met and reminiscences when he finds an emotional Meera standing there. They reunite happily.

Cast
 Barun Sobti as Haider Ali Khan
 Surbhi Jyoti as Meera Kapoor
 Aansh Arora as Vishal Malhotra
 Mohit Abrol as Siddharth Khanna "Sid", Haider's best friend, Avantika's husband
Priya Tandon as Avantika Khanna, Meera's best friend, Sid's wife
 Rahul Sharma as Raza Siddiqui, Haider's friend
Sheeba Chaddha as Mrs. Siddiqui, Raza's mother
 Neelam Sivia as Tanya, Meera's best friend
 Nisha Nagpal as Rashi

Development
On 3 June 2016, first teaser of the web show was released. On 30 September 2016, a 3-minute trailer of the web show was released on YouTube. On 14 February 2017, all episodes of the web series were aired on Hotstar.

References

External links
 Tanhaiyan on Hotstar
 

Indian drama web series
2017 Indian television series debuts
Hindi-language web series
Hindi-language Disney+ Hotstar original programming
Television series by 4 Lions Films
2017 Indian television series endings